Arangi is a village in Chandauli district, Uttar Pradesh, India.

Demography
As of the 2011 census, this village had a total population of 3,049 of which 1,512 are male while 1,537 are female.  A majority is part of the Rajput population known as nagvanshi rajputs.

References

Villages in Chandauli district